Nakotah Lomasohu Raymond LaRance (August 23, 1989 - July 12, 2020)  was a Native American hoop dancer and actor He was a citizen of the Hopi Tribe of Arizona.

Background 
LaRance was born on August 23, 1989, in Barrow, Alaska (now Utqiagvik). His parents are Marian Denipah (Navajo/Tewa) and Steve LaRance (Hopi/Assiniboine). Nakotah, hereceived a Hopi name “Lomasohu” by his paternal grandmother. Lomasohu means "handsome star" in the Hopi language. His parents were both jewelers and artists. He grew up in Flagstaff, Arizona, and spent summer in Moencopi, Arizona then move to New Mexico.

Dancing career 
At four years old, LaRance began dancing as a fancy dancer and competed in the youth division of the World Championship Hoop Dance Contest in Phoenix, Arizona. He performed on the Tonight Show with Jay Leno in 2004. 

LaRance won three championships in the youth division and three in the teenage division of the World Championship Hoop Dance competition. 

In 2009, LaRance joined the Cirque du Soleil troupe as a principal dancer. He worked as a traveling performer with the troupe for over three years. In 2015, he danced at the opening of the Pan American Games in Toronto with Cirque du Soleil.

He won the title of World Champion at the Hoop Dance Contest three times, as part of the adult division in 2015, 2016 and 2018.

LaRance taught hoop dancing to students at the Lightning Boy Foundation in New Mexico.

Death 
LaRance died at age 30 on July 12, 2020, after a fall from climbing a bridge in Rio Arriba County, New Mexico.

References

1989 births
2020 deaths
21st-century American dancers
Accidental deaths from falls
American male dancers
Cirque du Soleil performers
Dancers from New Mexico
Folk dancers
Native American dancers
Hopi people
People from Utqiagvik, Alaska
People from Flagstaff, Arizona
Tewa people